Milburn R. White (1878February 27, 1944) was an American educator politician who served in the Tennessee House of Representatives from 1915 to 1919, as a member of the Republican Party. His brother, Walter White, also served in the state legislature.

Early life
Milburn R. White was born in Meigs County, Tennessee, in 1878, to John White and Susan Couch. He graduated from Pin Hook High School in 1903, and attended Chattanooga Normal University and American Temperance University. He was a teacher in Rhea County for twenty-five years and worked for the Rhea County News. He married Cora, with whom he had no children, and Rowena Walker, with whom he had five children. His brother, Walter White, also served in the Tennessee General Assembly.

Tennessee House of Representatives
White served in the Tennessee House of Representatives from the 10th district, which his brother also held, from 1915 to 1919. William Hilleary unsuccessfully challenged him for the Republican nomination during the 1916 election. During his tenure he passed legislation creating Dayton, Tennessee's system of local government.

Death
White died in Louisville, Tennessee, on February 27, 1944.

References

Works cited
 

1878 births
1944 deaths
20th-century American educators
American schoolteachers
Republican Party members of the Tennessee House of Representatives
Tennessee Republicans